James Hasty (born 1936; died 11 October 1974) was a Northern Irish footballer who is best known for his time playing as a forward for Dundalk between 1960 and 1966. He was murdered in a sectarian killing in Belfast in October 1974 during the Troubles.

Early life
Jimmy Hasty was born in Belfast in 1936. In July 1950, when he was 14 years old, he lost his left arm in an industrial accident on his first day at work at Jennymount Mill in Belfast. He later received £1,200 compensation.

Career
Hasty played in junior football before joining Newry Town, who were in the second tier of the Irish League, in 1959. He then signed for Dundalk in November 1960, making a scoring debut against Cork Celtic at Oriel Park. His reputation as a goalscorer, who had learned to use his disability to his advantage on the pitch, had attracted Dundalk Director Jim Malone. When Malone saw Hasty play, he was so confident in his ability that he offered to pay the cost of the signing from his own funds in front of a sceptical board. Five weeks after his debut, Hasty scored the only goal in Dundalk's second Leinster Senior Cup win. Hasty quickly became a star attraction, with spectators flocking to grounds all over the League to see him play. 

By the time Hasty left Dundalk in 1966, he had won League, Top Four Cup and Leinster Senior Cup medals. He was also the joint top-scorer in the 1963–64 season and had assisted the first goal and scored the second in a European Cup tie away to FC Zürich, which was the first away victory by an Irish side in European competition. Over six seasons he made 170 appearances in all competitions, scoring 103 goals (59 goals in 98 League appearances).

He was released by Dundalk at the end of the 1965–66 season and joined Drogheda for one season before retiring. Both his final appearance and his final goal in the League of Ireland came in February 1967, when he scored for Drogheda against the Dundalk side that would go on to win the League that season.

Later life
Hasty was shot dead on Brougham Street in Belfast on 11 October 1974 while he was walking to work. His murder was claimed by Loyalist paramilitaries calling themselves the 'Ulster Protestant Action Group'. Hasty has been the subject of documentaries on RTÉ, BBC, and UEFA.

Honours
Dundalk
League of Ireland: 1
1962–63
Top Four Cup: 1
1963–64
Leinster Senior Cup: 1
1960–61

References

1936 births
1974 deaths

Association football forwards
Association footballers from Northern Ireland
Dundalk F.C. players
Expatriate association footballers from Northern Ireland
Expatriate association footballers in the Republic of Ireland
League of Ireland players
Newry City F.C. players